Shake Your Pants is the first compilation album by the funk group Cameo. Released in 1992, this out-of-print collection focuses on the band's earlier hits but passes over their more recent blockbusters. Some of the tracks had not been released as singles, making this collection unattractive to fans looking for a true hits collection. It was followed by The Best of Cameo in 1993.

Track listing
 "I Just Want to Be" - Blackmon, Johnson
 "The Rock - Blackmon 	
 "Macho" 		
 "I'll Always Stay" - Blackmon, Lockett 	
 "Shake Your Pants" - Blackmon 	
 "I Care for You" - Blackmon, Lockett 	
 "Feel Me" - Blackmon, Lockett 	
 "Keep It Hot" - Blackmon, Lockett 	
 "Freaky Dancin'" - Blackmon, Jenkins 	
 "Flirt" - Blackmon, Jenkins 	
 "Just Be Yourself" - Blackmon, Jenkins, Singleton 	
 "I Like It" - Blackmon, Campbell, Lockett, Mills

References

Cameo (band) albums
1992 compilation albums